My Ex and Whys is a 2017 Philippine romantic comedy drama film co-written and directed by Cathy Garcia-Molina. Starring Enrique Gil and Liza Soberano, the story is about a womanizer named Gio (Gil), who tries to prove he's a changed man to his ex-girlfriend, a blogger named Cali (Soberano). Cali, on the other hand, tests if Gio really has changed, and things didn't go as planned. The film was released on February 15, 2017, to commercial and critical success, grossing over ₱400 million worldwide. My Ex And Whys is the highest-grossing film to be starred by Soberano and Gil to date.

Cast

Main cast

Enrique Gil as Sergio "Gio" Martinez
Liza Soberano as Calista "Cali" Ferrer

Supporting cast
Joey Marquez as Lincoln "Master Pops" Martinez
Cai Cortez as Candelaria "Tita Candy" Ferrer
Emilio Garcia as Calixto Ferrer, Cali's Father
Arlene Muhlach as "Tita Libby", Cali's Aunt
Ara Mina as "Mommy Dolly", Cali's Mother
Ryan Bang as Lee
Joross Gamboa as Mustang Martinez
Jeffrey Tam as Daryl
Karen Reyes as Nina
Neil Coleta as Patrick
Dominic Roque as Jaguar Martinez
Nicco Manalo as Bert (Gio & Cali's Friend)
Hyubs Azarcon as Kia
Xander Gallego as Ford Martinez 
Kim Si-won as Kim Yu-Ri (Lee's fiancé) 
Kim Da-yul as Ha-Na (Yu-Ri's best friend)
Kimi Bo-ram as Shannon (Ha-Na's sister)
Joseph Kyle Pablo as Cali's Twin Brother 
Jello Andrei Pablo as Cali's Twin Brother 
Timothy Ancheta as Fred
John Uy as Darly's boyfriend

Special participation
Diego Loyzaga as Guy Customer
Sofia Andres as Lady Customer

Cameo appearances
Sandara Park
Karylle
Jhong Hilario
Billy Crawford
Vhong Navarro
Anne Curtis
Kathryn Bernardo
Daniel Padilla

International release
TFC released My Ex and Whys internationally around the same time said film was released in the Philippines. In North America, the film earned $434,000 on its first 3 days. Then, on its fourth day, it was estimated to have earned $630,000. On its 3rd weekend (ending March 5, 2017), the film earned an additional $110,000, summing up its 3-week North America gross to $1,300,000 

On February 26, My Ex and Whys registers total earnings of $5 million worldwide. This is composed of $4 million opening week gross in the Philippines and $1 million opening week gross from screenings in the Middle East, Europe, U.S. and Canada.

The film's commercial run has been extended in the U.S., Middle East, Canada and Southeast Asia.

Reception

Box office
My Ex and Whys earned ₱31.5 million on its opening day, and the figure increased to ₱100 million in three days. Another milestone was made as the film crossed over the ₱200 million mark in 8 days.<ref>{{cite web|title=My Ex and Whys' makes ₱200 million|url=http://news.abs-cbn.com/entertainment/02/24/17/my-ex-and-whys-makes-p200-million|publisher="ABS-CBN News"|accessdate=February 24, 2017|date=February 24, 2017}}</ref> After 17 days, the movie earned ₱341 million worldwide. On August 11, 2017, ABS-CBN released its first-half annual report where it announced that My Ex and Whys brought in over ₱400M million in ticket sales in its entire run in the cinemas.

Critical reception
Mari-an Santos of Philippine Entertainment Portal praised the two lead actors, stating that "the two have undeniable chemistry and play off each other well, whether it is in intense scenes or very casual time-wasters." Oggs Cruz from Rappler commented that Soberano "is able to charm her way out of her character’s inexplicable immaturity. Gil, on the other hand, plays the suffering ex-boyfriend with ample enthusiasm. If My Ex and Whys is meant to be a simple showcase of a love team’s power to arouse fantasy and make-believe, then it seems like it is all worth it." Philbert Dy through The Neighborhood'' complained that "the movie just takes it in a really bizarre, toxic direction. It essentially has its female protagonist go to borderline illegal lengths in order to prove herself right, the movie apparently unable to conceive of a way to display the pain that she went through without resorting to ludicrous antics. After that, it’s hard to buy into why this relationship needs to happen. The film, like so many of these romcoms, just takes the pairing for granted."

Awards and nominations

References

External links
 

2017 films
Philippine romantic comedy films
2017 romantic comedy films
Star Cinema comedy films
Films shot in South Korea
Films directed by Cathy Garcia-Molina